Events from the year 1012 in the Kingdom of Scotland.

Incumbents
Monarch — Malcolm II

Events 
 summer - Battle of Cruden Bay

References

 
11th century in Scotland